Local elections were held in Cebu City on May 13, 2013 within the Philippine general election. Registered voters of the city elected candidates for the following elective local posts: mayor, vice mayor, district representative, and eight councilors at-large for each district. There are two legislative districts in the city.

Mayoralty and vice mayoralty elections

Mayor
Michael Rama ran for his second term as the Mayor of Cebu City under his newly-formed group Team Rama facing off against his former partymate in Bando Osmeña – Pundok Kauswagan (BO–PK), Tomas Osmeña, whom he served with as vice mayor from 2001 to 2010. Rama went on to defeat Osmeña.

Vice mayor
Joy Augustus Young ran for his second term as the Vice Mayor of Cebu City and was defeated by a slim margin against incumbent Cebu City Councilor for the North District Edgardo Labella, who also left BO–PK to join Rama's group. It was Labella's first time to run for the said position.

District representatives

1st District
Incumbent representative Rachel Marguerite del Mar, who was still eligible for a second term, decided against running for re-election to give way to her father Raul del Mar. The elder Del Mar defeated actress and talent manager Annabelle Rama.

2nd District
Incumbent representative Tomas Osmeña, who was still eligible for a second term, decided against running for re-election to reclaim his old post as Mayor of Cebu City. Incumbent Cebu City Councilor for the South District Rodrigo Abellanosa defeated lawyer Aristotle Batuhan.

City Council
Incumbents are expressed in italics.

By ticket

Liberal Party/Bando Osmeña-Pundok Kauswagan

United Nationalist Alliance/Team Rama

Partido ng Manggagawa at Magsasaka

Independent

By district

1st District
Key: Italicized: incumbent

 

| colspan="7" style="background:black;"|

2nd District
Key: Italicized: incumbent

| colspan="16" style="background:black;"|

References

2013 Philippine local elections
Elections in Cebu City